Ryan Ebanks (born 10 December 1984 in the Cayman Islands) is a cricketer. A right-handed batsman and wicket-keeper, he has played for the Cayman Islands national cricket team since 2005.

Biography

Ryan Ebanks' first taste of representative cricket came in the Americas Under-19 Championship in King City, Ontario, Canada in July 2003. He played in all four matches in the tournament in which the Cayman Islands finished as runners-up to Canada.

His debut for the senior side came in February 2005 when he played in the repêchage tournament for the 2005 ICC Trophy. The Cayman Islands finished in 5th place in the tournament. In August of that year he played his two first-class matches against Bermuda and Canada at the Toronto Cricket, Skating and Curling Club.

In August 2006, he returned to King City to play in the senior Americas Championship, and most recently played for the Cayman Islands in Division Three of the World Cricket League in Darwin, Australia in May/June 2007.

References

1984 births
Living people
Caymanian cricketers
Wicket-keepers